Prescriptivism may refer to:

 Linguistic prescriptivism, the practice of laying down norms for language usage
 Universal prescriptivism, a meta-ethical theory of the meaning of moral statements